Nocardioides plantarum is a bacterium from the genus Nocardioides which has been isolated from herbage.

References

Further reading

External links
Type strain of Nocardioides plantarum at BacDive -  the Bacterial Diversity Metadatabase	

plantarum
Bacteria described in 1994